Minuscule 756 (in the Gregory-Aland numbering), ε1128 (von Soden), is a Greek minuscule manuscript of the New Testament written on parchment. Palaeographically it has been assigned to the 11th century. The manuscript has no complex contents. Scrivener labelled it as 772e.

Description 
The codex contains the text of the four Gospels, on 179 parchment leaves (size ), with some lacunae (Matthew 5:1-6:15; 6:29-8:12; John 4:31-21:25). The leaves are arranged in quarto (four leaves in quire).

The text is written in one column per page, 21 lines per page. It contains lectionary markings at the margin for liturgical use.

Text 
The Greek text of the codex is a representative of the Byzantine text-type. Hermann von Soden classified it as K text, established by Lucian of Antioch ca. 300 A.D. Aland placed it in Category V.

According to the Claremont Profile Method it represents textual family Kx in Luke 1, Luke 10, and Luke 20.

History 
Scrivener and Gregory dated  the manuscript to the 11th century. The manuscript is currently dated by the INTF to the 11th century.

The manuscript was written by Michael, a scribe; it belonged to Stephanus, a scribe. In 1892 it was held in Athens.

It was added to the list of New Testament manuscripts by Scrivener (772) and Gregory (756).

The manuscript is now housed at the Bibliothèque nationale de France (Suppl. Gr. 1083) in Paris.

See also 

 List of New Testament minuscules
 Biblical manuscript
 Textual criticism
 Minuscule 755

References

Further reading 

 

Greek New Testament minuscules
11th-century biblical manuscripts
Bibliothèque nationale de France collections